Historic and current bilateral relationship exist between Bahrain and Japan. Diplomatic relations were first established in 1972, and since then they have had increasing economic, cultural, and military cooperation, with Japan becoming one of the major trading partners of Bahrain. Several high-level official visits have taken place, including by King Hamad bin Isa Al Khalifa to Japan in 2012, Crown Prince Salman in 2013, and Prime Minister Shinzo Abe to Bahrain in 2013, with the governments of both countries expressing their intent to continue to increase their bilateral relations.

Japan recognized the kingdom in August 1971, and has maintained an embassy in Manama since 1988, while Bahrain has had an embassy in Tokyo since 2005. The Bahraini ambassador to Japan is Khalil Bin Ebrahim Hassan, who has held his post since 2005, while the Japanese ambassador to Bahrain has been Kiyoshi Asako since 2014. Bahrain's crown prince attended the state funeral of the assassinated Japanese Prime Minister Shinzo Abe in September 2022.

Trade 

The two countries have a history of successful economic cooperation, with Japan being one of the Gulf kingdom's major trading partners. Trade between them began in 1934, when the first shipment of Bahraini oil arrived in Yokohama, Japan. As of 2015, Bahraini exports to Japan are worth 39.1 billion Japanese yen while Bahraini imports from Japan are worth 107.3 billion Japanese yen. Japan has also spent about US$440,000 on grand aid in the country and US$17.37 million on technical cooperation with Bahrain. Thirteen trade agreements regarding healthcare and pharmaceuticals, education and training, oil and gas, and financial services were signed during Crown Prince Salman's official visit to Japan in March 2013.

Japan is Bahrain's fourth largest import partner.

Military cooperation 
Bahrain and Japan are Major non-NATO allies of the United States. Especially, Bahrain hosts the headquarters of U.S. 5th Fleet and Japan hosts the headquarters of U.S. 7th Fleet.

Many visits by top Japanese Self-Defense Forces officers and defense ministry officials have been made to Bahrain, while some Bahrain Defense Force officials have made visits to Japan.

High level visits 
The following Bahraini Ministers and leaders have made visits to Japan.

The following Japanese Ministers and leaders have made official visits to the Kingdom of Bahrain.

See also
Foreign relations of Bahrain
Foreign relations of Japan 
The Japanese School in Bahrain

External links
Embassy of Japan in Bahrain

References 

 
Japan
Bilateral relations of Japan